AGB Nielsen Media Research Philippines, commonly called AGB Nielsen, is a market research firm in the Philippines specializing in broadcast media. AGB Nielsen conducts audience measurement of television ratings for certain areas in the Philippines, most notably in urban areas.

As of 2013, AGB Nielsen uses a panel size of 1,980 households based solely in urban areas that represent 57  percent of the total Philippine TV viewing population.

History
AGB Nielsen was created by the merger of the Audits of Great Britain-Philippines (established in 1999) and Nielsen Media Research (established in 1992) in 2005 as a subsidiary of AGB Nielsen Media Research, a joint venture formed by the AGB Group & the TAM business of The Nielsen Company in March 2005.

In October 2006, AGB Nielsen established the Philippines' first national television audience measurement panel called the "Nationwide Urban Television Audience Measurement (NUTAM)" that covered 95% of urban areas in the country. AGB Nielsen also conducts reports on three metropolitan cities called "Metro City TAM" (MCTAM) in addition to, Metro Manila, Cebu City and Davao City and Iloilo City.

On December 20, 2007, ABS-CBN Broadcasting Corporation filed a civil case against AGB Nielsen after ABS-CBN discovered tampering in ratings in Bacolod. The next day, ABS-CBN reported through their AM station DZMM that AGB Nielsen pointed GMA Network was the one behind the manipulation of ratings in Bacolod. On January 3, 2008, GMA sued for P15 million ABS-CBN and some of its employees for libel. On January 8, Quezon City regional trial court (RTC) junked ABS-CBN's case against AGB Nielsen saying it was prematurely filed.

Markets

According to their website, the largest television market in the country is the Mega Manila; in AGB-Nielsen's case, Mega Manila consists of Metro Manila, Bulacan, Rizal, Cavite and Laguna. Mega Manila is represented by 400 panel homes. Other areas are North and Central Luzon with 300 homes; South Luzon, 300 homes; Visayas, 300 homes; and Mindanao, 200 homes. These 1,500 panel homes comprise the National Urban Television Audience Measurement (NUTAM) and are scattered throughout the country. The NUTAM, does not comprise the entire Philippines, but only the urban centers. The survey encompasses 34 million individuals or 95% of urban Philippines, which comprises around 57 percent of the entire TV viewing population of the country.

Classification
Non-primetime: 5:00 a.m. to 5:30 p.m.
Primetime: 5:30 p.m. to 5:00 a.m.

Subscribers

Nielsen's current international subscribers include GMA Network, SBS Korea, KBS Korea, Mediacorp, ebiquity, Faulkner, Dentsu Aegis Network, Posterscope, Group M, Zenith Optemedia, Telemundo, and Netflix.

FIFA has signed up with Nielsen to provide official market research for the 2017 FIFA Confederations Cup and the 2018 FIFA World Cup.

As of 2021, Nielsen TV Audience Measurement increased its client pool to a total of 41 clients/subscribers consisting of 12 local TV networks including A2Z, GMA Network, TV5, Cignal Entertainment, One Sports, CNN Philippines, Net 25, Solar Entertainment Corporation, Viva Communications Inc., CBN Asia, Kapamilya Channel, People's Television Network and among others; 5 regional clients; 2 blocktimers; 21 agencies (18 media agencies, 2 consulting agencies, 1 digital agency); and 1 advertiser.

Spinoffs

Nielsen Philippines spun off its data and analytics branch Global Consumer Business as NielsenIQ in January 2021.

See also
 Nielsen Korea
 The Nielsen Company
 Nielsen Media Research
 Nielsen Holdings
 Nielsen Corporation

References

Television in the Philippines
Market research companies of the Philippines
Companies based in Manila
Philippine subsidiaries of foreign companies